"Nine Little Miles from Ten-Ten-Tennessee" is a song written by Al Sherman, Al Lewis and Con Conrad.  It was recorded by Duke Ellington on November 21, 1930 by Victor Records #22586 64812-1/2.  The song is ASCAP code: (Title Code: 360000160)

 

Songs written by Al Sherman
Songs written by Al Lewis (lyricist)
1930 songs